Lutèce was a French restaurant in Manhattan that operated for more than 40 years before closing in early 2004. It once had a satellite restaurant on the Las Vegas Strip. 

It was famous for its Alsatian onion tart and a sauteed foie gras with dark chocolate sauce and bitter orange marmalade. In 1972, W magazine referred to it as one of "Les Six, the last bastions of grand luxe dining in New York." The other five were La Grenouille, La Caravelle, La Côte Basque, Lafayette, and Quo Vadis; of these, only La Grenouille remains open.

History
Lutèce was opened in 1961 by founder Andre Surmain, who brought young chef André Soltner to run the kitchen. Shortly thereafter, Surmain and Soltner became partners, and they ran the restaurant together until Surmain returned to Europe. He first retired to Majorca, then later ran Le Relais à Mougins in Mougins, southern France. In 1986, he returned to the US to open a branch of the same restaurant at the Palm Court Hotel in Palm Beach, Florida. 

Soltner became chef-owner of Lutèce until he sold it to Ark Restaurants in the 1990s. A second branch, located in the Grand Canal Shoppes at The Venetian Las Vegas on the Las Vegas Strip, opened in 1999 with David Feau as executive chef. Both locations earned the Mobil Travel Guide four star rating for the year 2002.

Lutèce closed on February 14, 2004, after a period of declining revenues attributed to having alienated its longtime customers with a change in menu following the restaurant's sale, and more general industry changes such as a decrease in lunchtime expense account diners and the effects on New York City's tourism industry following the September 11, 2001, attacks. 

Julia Child and a panel of food critics for Playboy magazine each proclaimed Lutèce the best restaurant in the United States, a rank it held in the Zagat's survey for six consecutive years in the 1980s.

In popular culture
The restaurant's reputation has led to it being used as a touchstone in film and television work made or set during the period when it was open. 
 in the book Marathon Man, set in the early 1970s, "Doc" takes "Babe" and his girlfriend "Elsa" there for a meal
 In season two of Mad Men, set in the 1960s, there are several scenes that are set at Lutèce and the restaurant is mentioned several times in other episodes. 
 The 1971 film A New Leaf shows Walter Matthau's character, once wealthy but now broke, visiting his favorite restaurant for the last time. 
 During the restaurant's 1980s heyday at the top of the Zagat's survey, it was mentioned in Wall Street (1987) by Gordon's call girl when talking to Bud Fox (Charlie Sheen).
 Mentioned in Crossing Delancey by Isabelle Grossman (Amy Irving) as the place of her intended birthday dinner.
 Mentioned in The Prince of Tides by Pat Conroy, in a scene where Dr. Susan Lowenstein and Tom Wingo dine together.
 Mentioned in the movie Arthur, where the wealthy title character visits his dying butler, Hobson, in the hospital, and places a lunch order for Hobson, saying "l want the trout almondine from Lutèce. Tell Henri it's for me." 
 Referenced in Jane Chambers’s 1980 play Last Summer at Bluefish Cove where the character Donna mentions Lutèce mâitre ‘d who made a assumptive remark to character Sue, a wealthy Blueblood whom Donna is in a romantic relationship with. 
 Referenced in Wendy Wasserstein's 1988 play The Heidi Chronicles where character Scoop Rosenbaum praises the souffle to Heidi.
 In the 1998 film The Last Days of Disco at the end of the film Josh mentions Alice invited him to go uptown to have lunch at Lutèce to celebrate her promotion.  
 Mentioned in Other People's Money, when Kate Sullivan (Penelope Ann Miller) invites Lawrence Garfield (Danny DeVito) to discuss a proposition about New England Wire and Cable Company.
In the 1963 Ian Fleming story Agent 007 in New York, James Bond refers to Lutèce as "one of the great restaurants of the world".
 Reference in Linda Fairstein's NY-based mystery series, especially Night Watch (2012).  In it a renowned French restaurateur, son of the owner of a fictitious Lutèce, sets out to reopen the restaurant.
 In Walter Tevis's sci-fi novel The Steps of the Sun (1983), protagonist Belson laments the demise of the restaurant. 
 In the HBOMax series  Julia, episode “Foie Gras,” set in the mid 1960s, “Julia Child,” her book editors have lunch at Lutèce and Julia has the signature foie gras.

References

Further reading

French restaurants in New York City
Defunct restaurants in New York City
Restaurants established in 1961
1961 establishments in New York City
Restaurants disestablished in 2004
2004 disestablishments in New York (state)
American companies established in 1961
American companies disestablished in 2004
Defunct French restaurants in the United States
Fine dining